Sairocaris is an extinct genus of crustaceans, in the order Hoplostraca, that lived in the Mississippian age.

References

External links
 Sairocaris at the Paleobiology Database

Prehistoric Malacostraca
Prehistoric crustacean genera
Carboniferous crustaceans